Ross Island is an island formed by four volcanoes in the Ross Sea near the continent of Antarctica, off the coast of Victoria Land in McMurdo Sound. Ross Island lies within the boundaries of Ross Dependency, an area of Antarctica claimed by New Zealand.

History

Discovery
Sir James Ross discovered it in 1840, and it was later named in honour of him by Robert F. Scott.

Ross Island was the base for many of the early expeditions to Antarctica. It is the southernmost island reachable by sea. Huts built by Scott's and Shackleton's expeditions are still standing on the island, preserved as historical sites.

Today Ross Island is home to New Zealand's Scott Base,  and the largest Antarctic settlement, the U.S. Antarctic Program's McMurdo Station. Greenpeace established World Park Base on the island and ran it for five years, from 1987 to 1992.

Geography

 	

Because of the persistent presence of the ice sheet, the island is sometimes taken to be part of the Antarctic mainland.

The planet's southernmost active volcano, Erebus, as well as the dormant volcano Terror, are situated on the island. They were named by Captain James Ross after his ships HMS Erebus and HMS Terror. The third highest elevation is Mount Bird, with Shell Glacier and Endeavour Piedmont Glacier on its slopes. Abbott Peak stands between Mount Erebus and Mount Bird. Gamble Cone and Kyle Cone stand in the east of the island. The Erebus hotspot is thought responsible for the island's volcanic activity.

Despite its relatively small size, Ross Island is the world's 6th highest island and the highest island in Antarctica. It has the highest average elevation of any island.

Landmarks
Many features on or near Ross Island have been charted and named by various survey and exploration groups.

Mount Erebus is the island's most prominent landmark. Hut Point Peninsula, the site of McMurdo Station (US) and Scott Base (New Zealand), projects southwest from its lower slopes. Barne Glacier projects off its western slopes. To the north of Mount Terror are the Kienle Nunataks.

The far eastern point of the island is called Cape Crozier. On the west side of the island is rocky Cape Evans, which forms the north side of Erebus Bay.

See also 

 Composite Antarctic Gazetteer
 Erebus hotspot
 Erebus Ice Tongue
 List of Antarctic and sub-Antarctic islands
 List of Antarctic islands south of 60° S
 List of islands of New Zealand
 McMurdo Sound
 New Zealand Subantarctic Islands
 Ross Sea
 Ross Bank
 SCAR
 Territorial claims in Antarctica
 Air New Zealand Flight 901
 Pakaru Icefalls

References

External links

 Coastal-change and Glaciological Map of the Ross Island Area, Antarctica, 1962-2005 United States Geological Survey

 
Volcanoes of the Southern Ocean
Islands of the Ross Dependency